Villain Enterprises was a villainous professional wrestling stable consisting of Marty Scurll, Brody King, PCO, and Flip Gordon. The stable performed in Ring of Honor (ROH), where they are former ROH World Six-Man Tag Team Champions, the National Wrestling Alliance (NWA), where King and PCO are former NWA World Tag Team Champions, and Australia's World Series Wrestling (WSW), where Scurll is the current WSW World Champion. King and PCO have also won both ROH's Tag Wars tournament and the NWA/ROH co-promoted Crockett Cup tournament in 2019, and previously held the ROH World Tag Team Championship, while Scurll and King are former WSW Tag Team Champions. They were joined by Flip Gordon at Best in the World.

History 
After December 14, 2018's Final Battle pay-per-view, Marty Scurll's fellow stablemates in The Elite left Ring of Honor while Scurll remained under contract. During an in-ring promo at the following night's Ring of Honor Wrestling taping, Scurll was confronted by The Kingdom members Matt Taven, T. K. O'Ryan, and Vinny Marseglia. Scurll subsequently unveiled a new stable, Villain Enterprises, with Brody King and PCO, leading to a brawl between the two groups that ended with Villain Enterprises standing tall. At the ROH 17th Anniversary Show in March, PCO and Brody King defeated The Briscoe Brothers for the ROH World Tag Team Championships in a Las Vegas street fight, and at the following Ring of Honor Wrestling television taping, Scurll, PCO, and King defeated The Kingdom to win the ROH World Six-Man Tag Team Championship. They would go to lose the ROH World Tag Team Championship to Guerillas of Destiny at G1 Supercard.

PCO and King would followed that by winning the vacant NWA World Tag Team Champions in the finals of the 2019 Crockett Cup tournament in April. In May, Scurll revealed in a promo that Villain Enterprises was looking for a fourth member. This storyline carried over into the Best of the Super Juniors 2019 tour for New Japan Pro-Wrestling (NJPW). King would accompany Scurll throughout the tournament, marking King's and Villain Enterprises' debut in NJPW. The two would compete in non-block tag team matches, and King would accompany Scurll to the ring for his tournament matches. At Best in the World, after Villain Enterprises retained the ROH Six-Man Tag Team Championship against Lifeblood, Scurll would reveal Flip Gordon as the new member. Gordon and the group would then attack Lifeblood. The group would come to an end in October 2020 with Scurll's departure from ROH due to sexual assault allegations that were made public during the Speaking Out movement as King and Gordon began focusing on singles competition while PCO began teaming with Mark Briscoe.

Championships and accomplishments 
 Game Changer Wrestling
GCW Extreme Championship (1 time, final) – PCO
 National Wrestling Alliance
 NWA World Tag Team Championship (1 time) – King and PCO
 Crockett Cup (2019) – King and PCO
 North Shore Pro Wrestliing
 NSPW Maritime Championship (1 time) – Gordon
 Ring of Honor
 ROH World Championship (1 time) – PCO
 ROH World Six-Man Tag Team Championship (1 time) – King, PCO and Scurll
 ROH World Tag Team Championship (1 time) – King and PCO
 ROH Tag Wars Tournament (2019) – King and PCO
 ROH World Championship No.1 Contendership Tournament (2019) - PCO  
 ROH Year-End Award (1 time)
 Faction of the Year (2020) – Gordon, King, PCO and Scrull
 World Series Wrestling
 WSW Tag Team Championship (1 time) – Scurll and King 
 WSW World Heavyweight Championship (1 time) – Scurll

References

National Wrestling Alliance teams and stables
Independent promotions teams and stables
Ring of Honor teams and stables